Ottaviano Nonni (1536 – 6 August 1606), called Il Mascherino, was an Italian architect, sculptor, and painter born in Bologna. Apprentice of Giacomo Barozzi da Vignola, he was active in Emilia and in Rome, where he had been living in the rione of Borgo, in the road still bearing his name (Via del Mascherino).

He was the architect of the Quirinal Palace under Pope Gregory XIII. His other works include the churches of San Salvatore in Lauro (1591), Santa Maria in Transpontina, the Bandini Chapel in San Silvestro al Quirinale, and the oval plan-design for the church of Santo Spirito in Sassia.

He died in Rome in 1606.

References

1536 births
1606 deaths
16th-century Italian architects
Architects from Bologna
Artists from Bologna